The Kluane First Nation (KFN) is a First Nations band government in Yukon, Canada. Its main centre is in Burwash Landing, Yukon along the Alaska Highway on the shores of Kluane Lake, the territory's largest lake. The native language spoken by the people of this First Nation is Southern Tutchone. They call themselves after the great Lake Lù’àn Män Ku Dän or Lù’àn Mun Ku Dän (″Kluane Lake People″).

The Kluane people occupy a traditional territory that extends from the St. Elias Mountains in the south, bounded to the east by the southern end of Kluane Lake and the A'ay Chu (formerly Slims River), by the Ruby Range to the north, extending almost to the Nisling River, and on the west by the Yukon Alaska Border. It includes the Tachal Region of Kluane National Park and Reserve.

Within this region, the three main defining topographic feature are the St. Elias Mountains to the south and west, the Shakwak Trench, which includes Kluane Lake, and the Kluane and Ruby Range to the east and north, which are part of the Yukon Plateau. the region is characterized by extremes of elevation, including some of the highest mountains in Canada, extreme temperature (-62C to +32C), low precipitation, wind and widespread permafrost.

Kluane First Nation is a Self-Governing First Nation with a Constitutionally protected Final Land Claims agreement and a Self-Government Agreement.  These agreements were signed in October 2003 - the parties to the agreement are Government of Canada, Government of Yukon and the Kluane First Nation.

The Kluane First Nation signed a land claims agreement in 2003.

External links
Kluane First Nation web site
Government of Canada's Department of Indian and Northern Affairs First Nation profile
Backgrounder on Kluane First Nation Final and Self-Government Agreements

First Nations in Yukon
First Nations governments in Yukon
Southern Tutchone